Twisted Edge Extreme Snowboarding, released as simply Twisted Edge Snowboarding in Europe, is a snowboarding video game released for the Nintendo 64, published by Midway Games in North America and by Kemco in Japan and Europe. Twisted Edge Extreme Snowboarding was not very well received commercially or critically.

Gameplay
The game has a two-player mode using a split screen.

Development
Twisted Edge Snowboarding was announced on June 10, 1997, just as development on it was starting. Kemco was to publish the game, but Midway acquired the rights to publish the game on October 15, 1997.

The game's design was heavily inspired by the Wave Race series. Much of the code for the game was recycled from Boss Game Studio's first Nintendo 64 game, Top Gear Rally. In particular, it used the same Alias plug-ins.

While Kemco was still the publisher, the company's Japanese division pushed for the game to include a story mode in the Japanese version, in part due to marketing research which determined that Wave Race 64 would have sold better in Japan if it had had a story. Boss Games took a tongue-in-cheek approach to adding story to the game, and opted to make the story mode an unlockable Easter egg in the U.S. version.

On January 22, 1998, the game was delayed for 4 months. The game was finally released on November 10, 1998 in the United States, followed by a Japanese release over a month later (December 18), before being ported to the PAL region and released on March 12, 1999.

Reception

The game received "mixed" reviews according to the review aggregation website Metacritic.

Critics had mixed opinions about the game and called the game a huge letdown. Reviewers criticized Boss Game Studios for delaying the game for 4 months to make the game "as best as possible". By pushing back the title, 1080° Snowboarding was released before Twisted's delay, which sold more units and is now labeled a classic. According to reviewers, everything about the game was mediocre. The music was pleasurable, but the gameplay was frustrating and the graphics did not live up to the standards that 1080° Snowboarding had set.

References

External links

1998 video games
Multiplayer and single-player video games
Nintendo 64 games
Nintendo 64-only games
Snowboarding video games
Video games developed in the United States